"5-1-5-0" is a song co-written and recorded by American country music artist Dierks Bentley. It was released in April 2012 as the third single from his 2012 album Home.  The song was written by Bentley, Brett Beavers, and Jim Beavers.

Background and writing
Co-writer Jim Beavers told Taste of Country that the idea for "5-1-5-0" came about when Bentley and he were discussing Van Halen's album 5150. Beavers said that he changed the pronunciation from "fifty-one-fifty" to "five-one-five-oh", and rhymed it with "somebody call the po-po" after seeing a police car.

Content
The title is a reference to the  5150 "involuntary psychiatric hold" in the California Welfare and Institutions Code. In it, the narrator sings that his lover is making him "crazy".

Critical reception
Bobby Peacock of Roughstock gave the song four stars out of five, saying that it was "fun to listen to" and "sticks in the head after only one listen." Billy Dukes of Taste of Country rated it four-and-a-half stars out of five, calling it "three minutes of reckless energy".

Music video
The music video was directed by Wes Edwards and premiered in June 2012.
No EVH 5150 amplifiers are in the video.

Chart performance

Year-end charts

Certifications

References

2012 singles
Dierks Bentley songs
Songs written by Dierks Bentley
Songs written by Brett Beavers
Songs written by Jim Beavers
Capitol Records Nashville singles
Music videos directed by Wes Edwards
Song recordings produced by Brett Beavers
2012 songs